Ablemma is a genus of araneomorph spiders in the family Tetrablemmidae that was first described by Carl Friedrich Roewer in 1963.

Species
 it contains twenty-seven species and one subspecies, found in Asia, on the Solomon Islands, in Kiribati, and Papua New Guinea:
Ablemma aiyura Shear, 1978 – New Guinea
Ablemma andriana Fardiansah & Dupérré, 2019 – Indonesia (Sumatra)
Ablemma baso Roewer, 1963 (type) – Indonesia (Sumatra)
Ablemma berryi Shear, 1978 – Caroline Is.
Ablemma circumspectans Deeleman-Reinhold, 1980 – Borneo
Ablemma contrita Fardiansah & Dupérré, 2019 – Indonesia (Sumatra)
Ablemma datahu Lehtinen, 1981 – Indonesia (Sulawesi)
Ablemma erna Lehtinen, 1981 – Indonesia (Sumatra)
Ablemma girinumu Lehtinen, 1981 – New Guinea
Ablemma gombakense Wunderlich, 1995 – Malaysia
Ablemma kaindi Lehtinen, 1981 – New Guinea
Ablemma k. avios Lehtinen, 1981 – New Guinea
Ablemma kelinci Fardiansah & Dupérré, 2019 – Indonesia (Sumatra)
Ablemma lempake Lehtinen, 1981 – Borneo
Ablemma makiling Lehtinen, 1981 – Philippines
Ablemma malacca Lin & Li, 2017 – Singapore
Ablemma merotai Lehtinen, 1981 – Borneo
Ablemma prominens Tong & Li, 2008 – China
Ablemma pugnax (Brignoli, 1973) – New Guinea, Solomon Is.
Ablemma rarosae Lehtinen, 1981 – Philippines
Ablemma ruohomaekii Lehtinen, 1981 – Thailand
Ablemma samarinda Lehtinen, 1981 – Borneo
Ablemma sedgwicki Shear, 1978 – Borneo
Ablemma shimojanai (Komatsu, 1968) – Japan (Ryukyu Is.)
Ablemma singalang Lehtinen, 1981 – Indonesia (Sumatra)
Ablemma sternofoveatum Lehtinen, 1981 – Borneo
Ablemma syahdani Lehtinen, 1981 – Borneo
Ablemma unicornis Burger, 2008 – Malaysia

See also
 List of Tetrablemmidae species

References

Araneomorphae genera
Spiders of Asia
Taxa named by Carl Friedrich Roewer
Tetrablemmidae